Frank O'Connor (April 11, 1881 – November 22, 1959) was an American character actor and director, whose career spanned five decades and included appearances in over 600 films and television shows. Early in his career he was also billed as Frank A. Connor and Frank L.A. O'Connor.  During the silent film era, he directed or was the assistant director on numerous films; he also penned several screenplays in both the silent and sound film eras. He is sometimes erroneously identified with the Frank O'Connor who was married to author Ayn Rand.

Life and career
Born on April 11, 1881, in New York City, O'Connor would begin his film career with a starring role in the 1915 silent film, The Voice in the Fog, which also starred Donald Brian and Adda Gleason.  He starred or had featured roles in six more films between 1917 and 1920, before focusing on work behind the camera.  During the remainder of the silent film era, he would write and/or direct over two dozen films, May McAvoy (several films, including Everything for Sale, 1921), Ralph Lewis (several films, including One of the Bravest, 1925), Clara Bow (several films, including Free to Love, 1925), Owen Moore (Go Straight, 1925), Jean Arthur (The Block Signal, 1926, which O'Connor also wrote), Gayne Whitman (Exclusive Rights, 1926), Wanda Hawley (Hearts and Spangles, 1926), Madge Bellamy (Colleen, 1927), Phyllis Haver (Your Wife and Mine, 1927), and Betty Compson (Masked Angel, 1928).  He also wrote four screenplays for silent films during the 1920s.

With the advent of sound in films, O'Connor would once again move in front of the camera. After 1930 he would only direct 2 sound films, The Call of the Circus in 1930, starring Francis X. Bushman, and 1939's The Mystic Circle Murder, which starred Robert Fiske and Betty Compson, and which O'Connor also wrote.  He would write the story for Sailor Be Good (1933), directed by James Cruze and starring Jack Oakie, as well as Adventure in Diamonds, directed by George Fitzmaurice and starring George Brent and Isa Miranda.

From 1930 right up to the year of his death in 1959, O'Connor would appear in over 600 films, serials, shorts, and television shows, mostly in small roles. Some of the more notable films he appeared in include: the original King Kong (1933), starring Fay Wray, as well as its sequel, The Son of Kong, also in 1933; 1935's The Little Colonel, starring Shirley Temple and Lionel Barrymore; John Ford's The Whole Town's Talking, starring Edward G. Robinson and Jean Arthur; the 1937 version of The Adventures of Tom Sawyer; Frank Capra's classic Mr. Smith Goes to Washington, again with Jean Arthur, also starring James Stewart and Claude Rains; John Ford's classic The Grapes of Wrath, adapted from the novel of the same name by John Steinbeck, and starring Henry Fonda and Jane Darwell; the iconic Citizen Kane, directed by and starring Orson Welles; Cover Girl (1944) starring Rita Hayworth and Gene Kelly; Capra's It's a Wonderful Life (1947), starring Jimmy Stewart and Donna Reed; the 1950 John Wayne vehicle, Sands of Iwo Jima (1950); Billy Wilder's Sunset Blvd. (1950), starring William Holden and Gloria Swanson; and the 1955 version of My Sister Eileen starring Janet Leigh, Jack Lemmon, and Betty Garrett. One of his final big screen performances would be in another small role in 1957's Jet Pilot, starring John Wayne and Janet Leigh. In addition to his feature film work, O'Connor would appear in several serials, including G-Men Never Forget in 1948, Superman in 1948, Ghost of Zorro (1949), Batman and Robin (1949), King of the Rocket Men (1949), The Invisible Monster (1950), Atom Man vs. Superman (1950), and Captain Video: Master of the Stratosphere (1951).

With the advent of television, O'Connor would make numerous appearances on the small screen. His first appearance was in a 1952 episode of Racket Squad.  Other series on which he appeared include: Dragnet, Adventures of Superman, and Perry Mason.  His final performance would be on a 1959 episode of M Squad, which aired on April 17, shortly before his death.

O'Connor died on November 22, 1959, at the age of 77, in Los Angeles, California.

Partial filmography

The Voice in the Fog (1915)
 Madame Sherry (1917)
 The Silent Witness (1917)
 The Unwritten Code (1919)
Everything for Sale (1921)
A Virginia Courtship (1921)
A Homespun Vamp (1922)
The Lawful Cheater (1925)
 One of the Bravest (1925)
 Go Straight (1925)
Free to Love (1925)
The Block Signal (1926)
Exclusive Rights (1926)
Hearts and Spangles (1926)
 The Silent Power (1926)
Spangles (1926)
Heroes of the Night (1927)
 Your Wife and Mine (1927)
Colleen (1927)
Why Sailors Go Wrong (1928)
The Masked Angel (1928)
Call of the Circus (1930)
King Kong (1933)
The Son of Kong (1933)
Roast Beef and Movies (1934)
Men of the Night (1934)
Buried Loot (1935) (uncredited)
Air Hawks (1935) (uncredited)
 His Fighting Blood (1935)
To Mary - with Love (1936) (uncredited)
Wives Never Know (1936) (uncredited)
The Man Who Lived Twice (1936) (uncredited)
Reefer Madness (1936)
Midnight Taxi (1937)
 52nd Street (1937)
Lawless Valley (1938)
Sunset Murder Case (1938)
Man Made Monster (1941)
Roar of the Press (1941)
The Gay Falcon (1941) (uncredited)
Thundering Hoofs (1942) (uncredited)
X Marks the Spot (1942) (uncredited)
A Gem of a Jam (1943)
Cover Girl (1944)
Lone Texas Ranger (1945) (uncredited)
Three's a Crowd (1945)
Mama Loves Papa (1945) (uncredited)
Days of Buffalo Bill (1946)
The Madonna's Secret (1946)
It's a Wonderful Life (1946)
Congo Bill (1948)
Ghost of Zorro (1949)
The Traveling Saleswoman (1950) (uncredited)
The Return of Jesse James (1950)
Smoky Canyon (1952) (uncredited)
Leadville Gunslinger (1952) (uncredited)
The Quiet Man (1952) (uncredited)
Angel Face (1953)
Savage Frontier (1953) (uncredited)
Red River Shore (1953) (uncredited)

References

External links

 
 

1881 births
1959 deaths
20th-century American male actors
American male screenwriters
American film directors
Male actors from New York City
American male silent film actors
Silent film directors
Screenwriters from New York (state)
20th-century American male writers
20th-century American screenwriters